The 2013 NAIA Division I women's basketball tournament was the tournament held by the NAIA to determine the national champion of women's college basketball among its Division I members in the United States and Canada for the 2012–13 basketball season.

Westmont defeated Lee (TN) in the championship game, 71–65, to claim the Warriors' first NAIA national title.

The tournament was played at the Frankfort Convention Center in Frankfort, Kentucky.

Qualification

The tournament field remained fixed at thirty-two teams, which were sorted into four quadrants of eight teams each. Within each quadrant, teams were seeded sequentially from one to eight based on record and season performance.

The tournament continued to utilize a simple single-elimination format.

Bracket

See also
2013 NAIA Division I men's basketball tournament
2013 NCAA Division I women's basketball tournament
2013 NCAA Division II women's basketball tournament
2013 NCAA Division III women's basketball tournament
2013 NAIA Division II women's basketball tournament

References

NAIA
NAIA Women's Basketball Championships
2013 in sports in Kentucky